Gamètì (formerly known as Rae Lakes until 4 August 2005), officially the Tłı̨chǫ Community Government of Gamètì is a community in the North Slave Region of the Northwest Territories, Canada. Gamètì, according to the Prince of Wales Northern Heritage Centre means "rabbit-net lake". 'Gah means 'rabbit', and "mi" means net, "tì" means lake, or water. It is one of the four Tłı̨chǫ communities which form part of the Tlicho Government.

History
The area is within the traditional territory of the Tłı̨chǫ (Dogrib) First Nations and was a popular hunting camp prior to permanent settlement. In the 1960s, Dene elders around Behchokǫ̀ decided to return to the land and establish traditional camps in the bush. Gamètì was established during this time, although in more recent years it too has become a modern community with essential services of its own. The community was officially known as Rae Lakes until August 4, 2005.

Before 2005, the community was unincorporated, and local governance was provided by a First Nations band government, Gameti First Nation. Under the terms of the Tłı̨chǫ Agreement, most responsibilities of Gamètì have been transferred to a new Gamètì Community Government. However, the First Nation is still recognized by the federal government for Indian Act enrollment.

Demographics

According to the 2016 Census there were 270 Indigenous people, of which all were First Nations.  Local languages are Dogrib (Tłı̨chǫ) some Slavey and English.

Services
The community, which is served by the Gamètì/Rae Lakes Airport, does not have all-weather road access, but an ice road is sometimes built in the winter. There is a daycare in the Gamètì and the Jean Wetrade School that provides education up to grade 12, along with a community learning centre. Other services include a post office, a two-member RCMP detachment, a health centre, with one nurse and the Rae Lakes General Store.

Climate
Gamètì has a subarctic climate (Dfc) with the average high throughout the year averaging below the freezing point. Due to it being below the tree line it has relatively warm but short summers.

See also
 List of municipalities in the Northwest Territories

References

Further reading

 Northwest Territories, and BHP Billiton Diamonds Inc. Communities and Diamonds Socio-Economic Impacts in the Communities of: Behchoko, Gameti, Whati, Wekweeti, Detah, Ndilo, Lutsel K'e, and Yellowknife : 2005 Annual Report of the Government of the Northwest Territories Under the BHP Billiton, Diavik and De Beers Socio-Economic Agreements. [Yellowknife]: Govt. of the Northwest Territories, 2006.

External links
Gamètì

Communities in the North Slave Region
Tłı̨chǫ community governments in the Northwest Territories
Dene communities
Road-inaccessible communities of the Northwest Territories